James Francis Thomson was an American politician from the state of Michigan.

Thomson was born in Jackson County, Michigan, November 19, 1891.  He was the son of James C. Thomson and Mary (Dack) Thomson. He resided in Jackson became a farmer and married Florence Elvira Sanford. Thomson was a member of Michigan State House of Representatives from Jackson County 2nd District, 1929–30; defeated in primary, 1924, 1932.  He was elected Chairman of the Michigan Republican Party from 1936 to 1939 and Chairman of Jackson County Republican Party, 1939–1941, 1950.  He was a candidate in primary for Lieutenant Governor of Michigan, 1940.  Thomson was Jackson County Treasurer from 1943 to 1962.  He was a delegate to Michigan state constitutional convention from Jackson County 2nd District, 1961–1962.  He was a Methodist and member of the Grange, the Freemasons, the Kiwanis, the Lions and the Odd Fellows.  James F. Thomson died in Tompkins Township, Jackson County, Michigan on April 21, 1973.

References 

 Political Graveyard

|-

1891 births
1973 deaths
Republican Party members of the Michigan House of Representatives
Michigan Republican Party chairs
People from Jackson County, Michigan
20th-century American politicians